Minden–Tahoe Airport  is a general aviation airport serving the Carson Valley in Douglas County, Nevada, United States, including the towns of Minden, Gardnerville and Genoa, Nevada; and Lake Tahoe to the west. The airport is about five miles north of Minden. It is home to the Sierra Front Interagency Dispatch Center and regional firefighting air tanker base.

The airport is a mecca for soaring, and many North American and world records have been flown out of Minden in the many gliders that it hosts.

A non-fatal mid-air collision near the Pine Nuts range between a glider and a small jet at  has heightened the awareness for all airplanes flying in the area that both types of aircraft need to watch for each other.

The airport is undergoing an expansion plan where glider operations will be moved to the east side of the airport.

Minden–Tahoe Airport is the base for the "Introduction to Soaring" tutorial mission supplied with Microsoft Flight Simulator X.

Facilities
A glider runway (12G/30G) has  of dirt.

In the year ending February 28, 2009 the airport had 79,800 aircraft operations, average 218 per day: 97% general aviation, 3% air taxi, and less than 1% military. 255 aircraft were then based at the airport: 56% single-engine, 9% multi-engine, 2% jet, 1% helicopter, 31% glider and less than 1% ultralight.

Airshow 
Minden-Tahoe hosts the Aviation Roundup, an annual event usually held in the fall. In 2016 and 2017, the airshow was headlined by the United States Air Force Thunderbirds demonstration team. The 2018 airshow featured the United States Navy Blue Angels.

References

External links
 Minden–Tahoe Airport, official website
 Aviation Roundup - Minden-Tahoe airshow website
 Sierra Front Interagency Dispatch Center
 Civil Air Patrol: Douglas County Composite Squadron
 Hutt Aviation
 SoaringNV
 Minden Soaring Club
 Soar Minden(closed ~3/2011)
 Aerial image as of September 1999 from USGS The National Map
  from Nevada DOT
 
 
 

Airports in Nevada
Buildings and structures in Douglas County, Nevada
Transportation in Douglas County, Nevada
Airports with year of establishment missing